Lucas Onyango (born May 12, 1981) is a Kenyan international development manager for the Kenya Rugby League. He used to play as a winger in rugby union for the Kenya national rugby union team and Sale Sharks, as well as Oldham RLFC (Heritage No. 1212) and Widnes Vikings in rugby league.

Playing career
In Kenya, he played for Mean Machine RFC, a Kenya Cup team affiliated to University of Nairobi. He played for Kenyan sevens team at the 2002 Commonwealth Games, after which he joined Manchester R.F.C. He moved to rugby league club Widnes Vikings in 2005.

Post-playing career
In August 2020, Onyango was appointed as the international development manager for Kenya Rugby League. His appointment showcased the vision to grow the sport in Kenya and prepare for 2025 Rugby League World Cup qualifiers.

Personal life
His sister Sharon Onyango has played for the Kenya women's national rugby union team.

References

External links
Oldham R.L.F.C. profile

1981 births
Living people
Expatriate rugby union players in England
Kenya international rugby union players
Kenyan expatriate rugby union players
Kenyan expatriate sportspeople in England
Kenyan Luo people
Kenyan rugby union players
Oldham R.L.F.C. players
Oxford Rugby League players
Rugby league wingers
Rugby union wings
Sale Sharks players
Widnes Vikings players